Kim Bong-jo (born 29 May 1942) is a South Korean wrestler. He competed in the men's Greco-Roman featherweight at the 1964 Summer Olympics.

References

1942 births
Living people
South Korean male sport wrestlers
Olympic wrestlers of South Korea
Wrestlers at the 1964 Summer Olympics
Place of birth missing (living people)
20th-century South Korean people